Wonder World is a natural theme park located in San Marcos, Texas.  The park's primary attraction is Wonder Cave, an ancient earthquake cave and Recorded Texas Historic Landmark. Other attractions include an anti-gravity house, a trackless motor train, and a wildlife park.

References

External links
Official Website

Buildings and structures in San Marcos, Texas
Recorded Texas Historic Landmarks
San Marcos, Texas
Tourist attractions in Hays County, Texas